The Ervin Homestead-Gist Bottom Historic District is a historic district in the Missouri Breaks area of Blaine County, Montana which was listed on the National Register of Historic Places in 2016.

It was homesteaded by John Ervin around 1910 then developed by the Gist family.

The Gist family sold the land to the Bureau of Land Management in 1980.  It is included in the Upper Missouri River Breaks National Monument.

References

Historic districts on the National Register of Historic Places in Montana
Buildings and structures completed in 1910
National Register of Historic Places in Blaine County, Montana
Ranches on the National Register of Historic Places in Montana
1910 establishments in Montana